The following article presents a summary of the 2003-2004 football season in Venezuela.

Torneo Apertura ("Opening" Tournament)

Venezuela national team

Notes

References
 Venezuelan Football Federation
 RSSSF
 National Team Results

 
Seasons in Venezuelan football